The Nigerian University Games Association (NUGA) organizes university-level sports events in Nigeria. It hosts an interuniversity sports competition called the University Games. The first NUGA games were held at the University of Ibadan in 1966. 36 Nigerian universities are members.

NUGA approves fifteen different sporting events at the University Games: track and field, badminton, basketball, chess, cricket, handball, hockey, judo, soccer, squash, swimming, table tennis, taekwondo, tennis, and volleyball.

History 
NUGA was founded in 1966 at the University of Ibadan following the first West African University Games (WAUG) in Ibadan in 1965.

In 1966, the first Nigerian University Games was held at the University of Ibadan the five Universities in Nigeria at that time namely: University of Ife (now Obafemi Awolowo University), Ile-Ife; University of Nigeria, Nsukka; University of Lagos, Akoka and Ahmadu Bello University, Zaria.

Presently, there are over eighty Universities as members of NUGA and this cut across private and public (Federal and State) owned.

At the beginning, only very few sports were involved but the number of sports have over time grown to Eighteen namely: Athletics, Badminton, Basketball, Chess, Cricket,E-sport, Football, Handball, Hockey, Judo, Karate, Scrabble, Squash, Swimming, Table Tennis, Taekwondo, Tennis and Volleyball.

Over the years, many University athletes have represented Nigeria at various international competitions like the Commonwealth and Olympic Games.  Some of the notable ones include Seyi Olofinjana (Football), Vincent Enyeama (Football), Bisi Afoloabi (Athletics), Olumide Oyedeji (Basketball), Chika Chukwumerije (Taekwondo) and Olusoji Fasuba (Athletics), who is the current African record holder in 100 metres (Men) with a time of 9.85 seconds.

It is pertinent to add that many more University athletes have turned professional after completing their University education.

In 1970, NUGA became a member of the World Federation of University Games (FISU), and in 1974 was a founding member of the All Africa University Games Association (FASU).

Winners by medals table  
The number of gold medals won in the competition are written in parenthesis.

References 

Universities and colleges in Nigeria
Uni
Sports organizations established in 1966
1966 establishments in Nigeria